Dahlia tenuicaulis is a species of flowering plant in the family Asteraceae, native to the mountains of southern Mexico. It is occasionally available from commercial suppliers.

References

tenuicaulis
Endemic flora of Mexico
Flora of Southwestern Mexico
Flora of Central Mexico
Flora of Veracruz
Plants described in 1969